The Mt Lindsay mine is a large open pit mine located in the northwest of Tasmania, Australia. Mt Lindsay represents one of the largest tungsten reserves in Australia having estimated reserves of 43 million tonnes of ore grading 0.1% tungsten.  40 million tonnes would support a 10-year mining operation.  The mine is owned by Venture Minerals.

See also 
List of mines in Australia

References 

Tungsten mines in Australia
Mines in Tasmania
North West Tasmania